Semiotus is a genus of beetle belonging to the family Elateridae. It includes about 85 large sized (14–48 mm) and colourful click beetles with bright integument. The colouration is usually yellow with longitudinal black, orange or reddish stripes. The Neotropical genus occurs from Mexico to Argentina and Chile.

List of species
 Semiotus acutus Candèze, 1874
 Semiotus aeneovittatus Kirsch, 1884
 Semiotus aliciae Wells, 2007
 Semiotus alternatus Schwarz, 1904
 Semiotus angulatus Drury, 1782
 Semiotus angusticollis Blanchard, 1843
 Semiotus angustus Wells, 2007
 Semiotus antennatus Schwarz, 1900
 Semiotus anthracinus Szombathy, 1909
 Semiotus approximatus Candèze, 1857
 Semiotus auripilis Candèze, 1874
 Semiotus badeni Steinheil, 1875
 Semiotus bifasciatus Schwarz, 1902
 Semiotus bispinus Candèze, 1874
 Semiotus boliviensis Candèze, 1897
 Semiotus borrei Candèze, 1878
 Semiotus brevicollis Candèze, 1857
 Semiotus buckleyi Candèze, 1874
 Semiotus candezei Kirsch, 1866
 Semiotus capucinus Candèze, 1857
 Semiotus caracasanus Rojas, 1855
 Semiotus carinicollis Kirsch, 1884
 Semiotus carus Janson, 1882
 Semiotus catei Wells, 2007
 Semiotus chassaini Wells, 2007
 Semiotus chontalenus Candèze, 1874
 Semiotus clarki Wells, 2007
 Semiotus colombianus Wells, 2007
 Semiotus conicicollis Candèze, 1857
 Semiotus convacus Aranda, 2004
 Semiotus convexicollis Blanchard, 1843
 Semiotus cristatus Candèze, 1874
 Semiotus cuspidatus (Chevrolat, 1833)
 Semiotus cuspidatus Chevrolat, 1833
 Semiotus cyrtomaris Wells, 2007
 Semiotus decoratus Candèze, 1857
 Semiotus diptychus Candèze, 1874
 Semiotus distinctus Herbst, 1806
 Semiotus dohrni Candèze, 1889
 Semiotus elegantulus Candèze, 1857
 Semiotus exsolutus Candèze, 1857
 Semiotus fascicularis Candèze, 1857
 Semiotus flavangulus Candèze, 1900
 Semiotus fleutiauxi Szombathy, 1909
 Semiotus formosus Janson, 1882
 Semiotus fryi Candèze, 1874
 Semiotus fulvicollis Blanchard, 1843
 Semiotus furcatus (Fabricius, 1792)
 Semiotus fusciformis Kirsch, 1866
 Semiotus germari Guerin, 1844
 Semiotus gibbosus Wells, 2007
 Semiotus girardi Chassain, 2002
 Semiotus glabricollis Candèze, 1857
 Semiotus hispidus Candèze, 1889
 Semiotus horvathi Szombathy, 1909
 Semiotus illigeri Guerin, 1844
 Semiotus illustris Candèze, 1857
 Semiotus imperialis Guerin, 1844
 Semiotus insignis Candèze, 1857
 Semiotus intermedius Herbst, 1806
 Semiotus jansoni Candèze, 1874
 Semiotus juvenilis Candèze, 1874
 Semiotus kathleenae Wells, 2007
 Semiotus kondratieffi Wells, 2007
 Semiotus lacrimiformis Wells, 2007
 Semiotus langei Schwarz, 1902
 Semiotus ligatus Candèze, 1889
 Semiotus ligneus (Linnaeus, 1767)
 Semiotus limatus Candèze, 1889
 Semiotus limbaticollis Candèze, 1857
 Semiotus linnei Guerin, 1844
 Semiotus luteipennis Guerin, 1838
 Semiotus macer Candèze, 1889
 Semiotus matilei Chassain, 2001
 Semiotus melanocephalus Schwarz, 1902
 Semiotus melleus Wells, 2007
 Semiotus morio Candèze, 1857
 Semiotus multifidus Candèze, 1874
 Semiotus nigriceps Candèze, 1857
 Semiotus nigricollis Candèze, 1857
 Semiotus nigrolineatus Schwarz, 1900
 Semiotus oranense Aranda, 2004
 Semiotus pallicornus Wells, 2007
 Semiotus pectitus Candèze, 1889
 Semiotus perangustus Wells, 2007
 Semiotus pilosus Wells, 2007
 Semiotus pulchellus Candèze, 1889
 Semiotus punctatostriatus Candèze, 1857
 Semiotus punctatus Candèze, 1857
 Semiotus quadricollis Kirsch, 1866
 Semiotus quadrivittis Steinheil, 1875
 Semiotus reaumuri Candèze, 1857
 Semiotus regalis Guerin, 1844
 Semiotus rileyi Wells, 2007
 Semiotus ruber Pjatakowa, 1941
 Semiotus rubricollis Wells, 2007
 Semiotus sanguinicollis Blanchard, 1843
 Semiotus sanguinolentus Candèze, 1900
 Semiotus schaumi Guerin, 1844
 Semiotus scitulus Candèze, 1864
 Semiotus seladonius Guerin-Meneville, 1844
 Semiotus singularis Kirsch, 1884
 Semiotus sommeri Candèze, 1857
 Semiotus spinosus Wells, 2007
 Semiotus splendidus Candèze, 1881
 Semiotus staudingeri Pjatakowa, 1941
 Semiotus stramineus Candèze, 1857
 Semiotus striatus Guerin, 1855
 Semiotus subvirescens Schwarz, 1904
 Semiotus superbus Kirsch, 1866
 Semiotus supplicans Kirsch, 1884
 Semiotus taeniatus Erichson, 1847
 Semiotus trilineatus Candèze, 1857
 Semiotus trinitensis Wells, 2007
 Semiotus triplehorni Wells, 2007
 Semiotus vicinus Fleutiaux, 1920
 Semiotus virescens Candèze, 1857
 Semiotus virgatus Erichson, 1847
 Semiotus woodi Wells, 2007
 Semiotus zonatus Candèze, 1874

References

Further reading
 Samuel A. Wells (2007) Natural History Museum of Los Angeles County
 Elateridae in SYNOPSIS OF THE DESCRIBED COLEOPTERA OF THE WORLD

Elateridae genera
Beetles of South America